This is a list of people from Middlesbrough, a town in North Yorkshire, England. They include actors, comedians, artists, television presenters, footballers and rugby players. This list is arranged alphabetically by surname:



A
 Abbey Altson, artist
 Matty Appleby, (born 1972) footballer, played for Newcastle United, Oldham Athletic, and Darlington F.C.
 Fred Appleyard, visual artist
 James Arthur, musician
 John Archer, magician/comedian
 Ron Aspery, musician
 Bill Athey, cricketer

B
 Andrew Baggett, rugby union player
 Ian Bailey, retired football player
 John Baines, Olympic bobsledder
 Pat Barker's debut novel Union Street was set on the thoroughfare of the same name in the town
 Thelma Barlow, (born 1929) actress, starred in Coronation Street as Mavis Wilton from 1971 to 1997
 Peter Beagrie, footballer
 Florence Bell, (1851–1930) writer of the classic study, At The Works (1907), gives a picture of the area at the turn of the 20th century. She also edited the letters of her stepdaughter Gertrude Bell (1868–1926), which has been continuously in print since 1927
 Stephen Bell, footballer
 Adrian Bevington, The Football Association's former Director of Communications
 Sean Blowers, actor
 Henry Bolckow, industrialist
 Roy Chubby Brown, comedian
 Ali Brownlee, (1959–2016) radio presenter

C

 Elizabeth Carling, actress
 Jacky Carr, footballer
 Maud Chadburn was one of the earliest women in the United Kingdom to pursue a career as a surgeon. She also co-founded the South London Hospital for Women and Children in 1912 with fellow surgeon Eleanor Davies-Colley
 Alethea Charlton, actress
 Brian Clough, (1935–2004) footballer and manager, Played for Middlesbrough F.C. from 1955 to 1961 and managed Derby County, Leeds United and Nottingham Forest
 Kevin Connelly, comedian
 Geoff Cook, cricketer
 Captain James Cook (1728–79) the world-famous explorer, navigator, and cartographer was born in Marton, now a suburb of Middlesbrough
 Chris Corner, musician
 Mark Clemmit BBC Sport reporter

D
 Caroline Dale, classical and pop cellist
 Wally K Daly, writer, Ishy Din
 David Daniell, former junior World and European track cycling champion 
 Martin Daniels, magician
 Paul Daniels, born Newton Edward Daniels (1938–2016) magician, presenter and entertainer
 Billy Day, (1936–2018) footballer, played for Middlesbrough F.C during the 1950s and 60s
 Preeti Desai, actress and model, former Miss Great Britain (2007)
 Jerry Desmonde, (1908–1967) actor, who starred in The Early Bird with Norman Wisdom
Paul C. Doherty, author, educator, historian and lecturer
 Monica Dolan, actress
 Liam Donaldson, (b 1949) Chief Medical Officer for England
 Chris Dooks, visual artist
 Stewart Downing, footballer
 Tom Dresser, (1892–1992), Middlesbrough's first Victoria Cross recipient during the First World War
 Paul Drinkhall, Olympic table tennis player 
 Glen Durrant, darts player

E
 Joan Eadington, writer of The Jonny Briggs series of books, later to become a BBC Children's TV series of the same name, was also based in the town
 Florence Easton, soprano at the New York Met 
 Alfred Edwards, (1888–1958) Member of Parliament
 Frank Elgee, (1880-1944) archaeologist, geologist and naturalist

F
 Craig Farrell, (born 1982) footballer
Graham Farrow, playwright, screenwriter
 Pete Firman, magician
 Ford Madox Ford, (1873–1939) was billeted in Eston during the Great War (1914–18), and his great novel sequence Parade's End is partly set in Busby Hall, Little Busby, near Carlton-in-Cleveland
 Dael Fry, footballer

G
 Vin Garbutt, folk musician
 Ben Gibson, footballer
 Steve Gibson, entrepreneur and owner of Middlesbrough F.C. born in the Park End area
 Gary Gill, footballer
 Neil Grainger, actor
 Alistair Griffin, musician

H
 Marion Coates Hansen, was an active member of the local Independent Labour Party (ILP). She was a feminist and women's suffrage campaigner, an early member of the militant Women's Social and Political Union (WSPU) and a founder member of the Women's Freedom League (WFL)
 David Harper, antiques expert
 Jack Hatfield, Olympic swimmer
 Emily Hesse, visual artist 
 Jack Hatfield, (1893–1965) swimmer, known as one of the greatest British swimmers of all time after winning 2 Silvers and 1 Bronze at Stockholm 1912
 Jonathan Hogg, (born 1988) footballer
 Stanley Hollis, (1912–1972), Second World War Victoria Cross recipient
 E. W. Hornung, the creator of the gentleman-crook Raffles
 Keith Houchen, footballer
 Jordan Hugill, footballer

J
 Naomi Jacob, novelist
 Matt Jarvis, footballer
 Ann Jellicoe, writer Ishy Din
 Alyson Jones, Commonwealth Games swimmer
 Jade Jones, paralympic athlete

K
 Chris Kamara, (born 1957) ex footballer, manager, presenter and analyst on Sky Sports
 Lila Kaye, actress
 Richard Kilty, Olympic Athlete (1989 - Present)

L
 Graeme Lee, footballer

M
Wilf Mannion, (1918–2000) footballer
 Faye Marsay, actress
 Herbert McCabe, Roman Catholic and Dominican priest, theologian and philosopher
 Steph McGovern, (born 1982) presenter and journalist
 Richard Milward, writer, Ishy Din
 Jade McSorley, model
 Nicky Mohan, footballer
 Glenn Moody, darts player
 Micky Moody, musician
 Dave Morris, comedian
 Bob Mortimer (born 1959), comedian from Acklam
 Peter Murray, founding director of the Yorkshire Sculpture Park

N
 Sir Martin Narey, (1955–present), former Director General of Her Majesty's Prison Service and the chief executive of Barnardo's
 Chris Newton, Olympic cyclist 
 Robert Nixon (artist), (1939–2002) artist, who worked on several British comics

O
 Kirsten O'Brien, TV presenter 
 Alan Old, rugby union player
 Chris Old, cricketer
 Richard Old, (1856–1932) model maker resided for most of his life at 6 Ruby Street
 Colin Osborne, darts player

P
 Jamie Parker, actor
 Alan Peacock, footballer
 Dave Pennington world powerlifting champion 
 Liam Plunkett, cricketer
 Mark Proctor, footballer

Q
 Bertha Quinn, (1873 -1951) suffragette, Labour Councillor and recipient of Papal Bene Merenti Medal
 Christopher Quinten, actor

R
 Richard Piers Rayner, visual artist
 Chris Rea, musician 
 Matt Renshaw, cricketer
 Don Revie, (1927–1989) footballer and manager, managed Leeds United and England in the 1970s
 Wendy Richard, (1943–2009) actress, starred in Are You Being Served?, Dad’s Army &  EastEnders.
 Stuart Ripley, (born 1967) footballer, played for Middlesbrough F.C, Blackburn Rovers + Southampton
 Paul Rodgers, (born 17 December 1949) singer with Free and Bad Company
 Mike Russell, billiards player 
 Marion Ryan, singer
Jack Rees, professional cyclist and manager

S
 David Shayler, the ex-spy, journalist and conspiracy theorist, was born in Middlesbrough
 Harold Shepherdson, footballer, played for Middlesbrough.
 Rob Smedley, head of vehicle performance WilliamsF1 
 Cyril Smith, (1909–1974) concert pianist.
 Graham Smith, photographer
 Paul Smith (rock vocalist), musician
 James Smurthwaite, (1916–1989) cricketer, played 7 matches for Yorkshire County Cricket Club in 1938 and 1939
 Phil Stamp (born 1975), footballer, played for Middlesbrough F.C from 1993 to 2002, retired at Darlington F.C in 2007

T
 John Telfer, actor
 Bruce Thomas, musician
 William Tillyer, visual artist
 Chris Tomlinson, three times Olympian and former British long jump record holding athlete 
 Mackenzie Thorpe, painter
 Pete Trewavas, musician
 Paul Truscott, boxer

U
 Rory Underwood, rugby union player

V
 Simon Vallily, Commonwealth gold medal champion boxer
 John Vaughan, industrialist

W
 Adrian Warburton, air photographer, was played by Alec Guinness in Malta Story
 Frank and Edgar Watts, opened the English Hotel in the Cumberland Gap which gave their hometown's name to Middlesboro, Kentucky, in the United States 
 Ellen Wilkinson, was an Member of parliament for Middlesbrough East, and was the first female Minister of Education. She also wrote a novel Clash (1929) which paints a positive picture of "Shireport" (Middlesbrough)
 Tim Williamson, (1894–1943) footballer, made 602 appearances as a goalkeeper for Middlesbrough F.C. and 7 appearances for England
 Aimee Willmott, Olympic swimmer
 Dean John-Wilson, theatre actor
 Jeff Winter, (born 1955) football referee, he took charge of the F.A Cup Final of 2004
 Jonathan Woodgate, (born 1980) footballer + manager

References

Sources 

Middlesbrough